2003 saw many sequels and prequels in video games, such as Tony Hawk's Underground, Final Fantasy X-2, Mario Kart: Double Dash, Mario & Luigi: Superstar Saga, Prince of Persia: The Sands of Time, Sonic Heroes, Star Wars: Knights of the Old Republic,  and WWE SmackDown! Here Comes the Pain. New intellectual properties included Beyond Good & Evil, Boktai: The Sun is in Your Hand, Call of Duty, Disgaea, Drakengard, Manhunt, PlanetSide, TrackMania, True Crime: Streets of LA, and Viewtiful Joe.

The year's best-selling video game worldwide was Pokémon Ruby/Sapphire, the fifth time a Pokémon games was the annual worldwide top-seller (since 1998). The year's most critically acclaimed gamess were Grand Theft Auto Double Pack (compilation of Grand Theft Auto III and Vice City from previous years) and The Legend of Zelda: The Wind Waker (North American release of 2002 game).

Events
February 27 – Academy of Interactive Arts & Sciences hosts 6th Annual Interactive Achievement Awards; inducts Yu Suzuki of Sega to the AIAS Hall of Fame.
March 6–9 – Game Developers Conference hosts 3rd annual Game Developers Choice Awards and Gama Network's 5th annual Independent Games Festival (IGF).
April 1 – Enix Corporation and Square Co., Ltd. officially merge, forming Square Enix Co., Ltd.
May 14–16 – 9th annual E3 (Electronic Entertainment Expo) held at Los Angeles Convention Center; 6th annual Game Critics Awards for the Best of E3.
July – IEMA (Interactive Entertainment Merchants Association) hosts 4th annual Executive Summit.
July 16 – Interactive Digital Software Association (IDSA) renamed as Entertainment Software Association (ESA).
September 12 – Valve releases their game distribution software Steam out of beta.
October 1 – DreamWorks SKG and Tecmo announce a movie adaptation of the video game Fatal Frame has been fast-tracked with John Rogers and Steven Spielberg involvement.
October 20 – Families of Aaron Hamel and Kimberly Bede, two young adults shot by teens William and Josh Buckner (who in statements to investigators claimed their actions were inspired by Grand Theft Auto III), file a US$246 million lawsuit against developer Rockstar Games, publisher Take-Two Interactive Software, retailer Walmart, and console-maker Sony Computer Entertainment America.
October 31 – British Academy of Film and Television Arts announces that nominations for the 6th annual BAFTA Interactive Entertainment Awards will instead be split between the 1st annual BAFTA Games Awards for video game publications and (on November 24) the BAFTA Interactive Awards for multimedia technologies; ceremonies to be held in February 2004.
November – Kazushige Nojima resigns from Square Enix.

Hardware
February 14 – Nintendo releases the Game Boy Advance SP, an enhanced version of the Game Boy Advance.
March 23 – Nintendo stops production of the original Game Boy and Game Boy Color worldwide.
September 23 – Nintendo stops production of the NES and Super NES worldwide.
Nokia releases the hybrid N-Gage handheld console and mobile phone.
First PlayStation Portable prototype shown by Sony.
Nintendo states that its next generation console would be fully compatible with the GameCube.

Business
Early 2003 – Compile goes defunct.
February 19 – Microsoft announces a deal to buy Connectix Corporation.
Take-Two Interactive buys TDK Mediactive, Inc.
May 7 – Infogrames Entertainment, SA rebrands all its subsidiaries under the Atari brand.
Enix Corporation officially absorbs Square Co., Ltd., forming Square Enix Co., Ltd.
CNN Money reports that video games are a US$10 billion industry
April – Pan European Game Information (PEGI), a European video game content rating system, comes into use.
May – The 3DO Company announces bankruptcy and closes down its New World Computing subsidiary.
June 12 – Obsidian Entertainment founded.
August 1 – Virgin Interactive is renamed to Avalon Interactive by its owner Titus Software.
August – Microsoft announced ATI as the developer of the GPU for their next generation console, Project Xenon. Their previous contract with Nvidia was finished but the GPU of the Xbox continued in production.
September – Silicon Dreams Studio goes defunct.
December – Interplay closes its Black Isle Studios division.
Late 2003 – Nintendo buys shares from Japanese toy and animation conglomerate Bandai making Nintendo one of Bandai's top 10 shareholders.
Late 2003 – Data East goes defunct.

Trends
Computer games continue to lose ground to console video games with a US sales drop of 14% in 2003. Total 2003 entertainment software sales in the United States grew slightly to US$7 billion; console sales increased to $5.8 billion and computer games accounted for the remaining $1.2 billion.

Video game consoles
The dominant video game consoles in 2003 were:
Sony's PlayStation 2
Nintendo's GameCube
Microsoft's Xbox
Sony's PlayStation

Handheld game systems
The dominant handheld systems in 2003 were:
Nintendo's Game Boy Advance

Additionally, two new handheld consoles were introduced in 2003, the Game Boy Advance SP (an enhanced GBA) and Nokia's N-Gage.

Best-selling video games

Japan

United States

PAL regions

Games with notable critical reception
Metacritic (MC) and GameRankings (GR) are aggregators of video game journalism reviews.

Critically acclaimed games

Critically panned games

Notable releases

See also
2003 in games

References

 
Video games by year